The Spinster Stakes (also known as the "Juddmonte Spinster" with Juddmonte Farms sponsorship) is an American Thoroughbred horse race for fillies and mares aged three or up run annually in early October at Keeneland Racecourse in Lexington, Kentucky. It is set at a distance of one and one-eighth miles and is a Grade I event with a current purse of $600,000.

The Spinster, sponsored by Prince Khalid Abdullah's Juddmonte Farms beginning in 2005, is a major prep for the Breeders' Cup Distaff and one of the most important weight-for-age stakes races exclusively for fillies and mares. Now part of the Breeders' Cup Challenge series, the winner of the Spinster Stakes automatically qualifies for the Breeders' Cup Distaff.

In time for the 2006 edition of the Spinster Stakes, Keeneland replaced its traditional dirt track with the synthetic surface, Polytrack synthetic dirt. In 2014, the Polytrack was replaced by a new dirt surface.

Records
Speed record
On new dirt surface:
 1:49.44 – Got Lucky (2015)

On synthetic dirt: 
 1:46.77 – Carriage Trail (2008)

On old dirt surface:
 1:47.00 – Bayakoa (1990)
 1:47.00 – Banshee Breeze (1998)
 1:47.19 – Keeper Hill (1999)

Most wins
 2 – Bornastar (1957, 1958)
 2 – Susan's Girl (1973, 1975)
 2 – Bayakoa (1989, 1990)
 2 – Take Charge Lady (2002, 2003)

Most wins by an owner
 2 – J. Graham Brown (1957, 1958)
 2 – Fred W. Hooper (1973, 1975)
 2 – John A. Bell III (1983, 1988)
 2 – Frank E. Whitham (1989, 1990)
 2 – Allen E. Paulson (1992, 2004)
 2 – Sidney H. Craig (1993, 1996)
 2 – Ogden Mills Phipps (1994, 1995)
 2 – Select Stable (2002, 2003)

Most wins by a jockey
 5 – Laffit Pincay Jr. (1972, 1975, 1985, 1989, 1990)
 5 – Pat Day (1983, 1991, 1994, 1997, 2004)

Most wins by a trainer
 5 – Todd A. Pletcher (2007, 2012, 2015, 2020, 2022)

Winners

References

Graded stakes races in the United States
Grade 1 stakes races in the United States
Mile category horse races for fillies and mares
Breeders' Cup Challenge series
Keeneland horse races
Recurring sporting events established in 1956
1956 establishments in Kentucky